The k.k. Landesschützen (in English, "imperial-royal country [or provincial] rifleman") – from 16 January 1917  Kaiserschützen ("imperial rifleman") – were three regiments of Austro-Hungarian mountain infantry during the kaiserliche und königliche Monarchie (the "imperial and royal monarchy"). As a rule, only Tyrolean and Vorarlbergen men were enlisted in the Landesschützen.

History 
The Tyrolean Landesschützen ("territorial infantry") were established on 19 December 1870 with ten battalions.  Two companies of mounted infantry were added in 1872.  In 1906, they were reorganized on the pattern of the Italian Alpini as mountain troops.

Despite being territorial forces, the Kaiserschützen were used in the First World War in many theatres and took heavy losses.

Deployments 1914–1918 
 Galicia: Lemberg, Gródek, Przemyśl, Pilica, Limanowa Lapanow, Gorlice Tarnów, Carpathia
 Serbia
 Tyrol, Carniola: Monte Cristallo, Monte Piano, Falzarego, Tofana, Col di Lana, Marmolada, amongst others

The Kaiserschützen were deployed principally in opposition to the Italian Alpini.  By the date of the armistice, 4 November 1918, the second and third regiments were positioned on Zugna Torta, over Monte Corno, up to Monte Spil.  The first regiment were in the Adamello-Presanella Alps.

Military awards 
Soldiers of the Kaiserschützen received numerous military decorations:

Awards to Officers 
 5 awards of the Military Maria Theresa Order
 4 awards of the Order of the Iron Crown, 2nd Class
 2 awards of the military merit crosses, 2nd Class
 29 awards of the Leopold Order
 166 awards of the Order of the Iron Crown, 3rd Class
 563 awards of the military merit cross, 3rd Class
 427 awards of the Signum Laudis in silver
 1,111 awards of the Signum Laudis in bronze
 13 awards of the Golden Medal of Honor for officers
 14 awards of the silver valor medal for officers

Awards to Other Ranks 
 130 awards of the Golden Medal of Honor
 2,797 vSilver Medal of Valor, 1st Class
 9,820 awards of the Silver Medal of Valor, 2nd Class
 13,025 awards of the Bronze Medal of Honor

Further reading 
 Heinz von Lichem: Spielhahnstoß und Edelweiß. Stocker, Graz (1977)  
 Karl Glückmann: Das Heerwesen der österreichisch-ungarischen Monarchie : für den Unterricht und das Selbststudium Vienna: L.W. Seidel & sohn (1911)  
 Georg Bartl: Tiroler Landesschützen/Kaiserschützen – Ein Rückblick Innsbruck (1930)  
 Günther Hebert: Das Alpenkorps: Aufbau, Organisation und Einsatz einer Gebirgstruppe im ersten Weltkrieg  
 H. Boldt, (1988)    page 144

Military units and formations of Austria-Hungary in World War I
Establishments in the Empire of Austria (1867–1918)
Mountain troops
Military units and formations established in 1870
1870 establishments in Austria-Hungary